Eurytaenia is a genus of flowering plants belonging to the family Apiaceae.

Its native range is Oklahoma to Texas.

Species:

Eurytaenia hinckleyi 
Eurytaenia texana

References

Apioideae